This is a list of airports in Lithuania, grouped by type and sorted by location



Airports

See also 
 Transport in Lithuania
 List of airports by ICAO code: E#EY - Lithuania
 Wikipedia:WikiProject Aviation/Airline destination lists: Europe#Lithuania
 List of the largest airports in the Nordic countries

References 
 Civilines Aviacijos Administracija (Civil Aviation Administration) 
 List of civil aerodromes in Lithuania 
 AIP Lithuania: Location Indicators
 
 
  – includes IATA codes
  – ICAO codes and coordinates
  – IATA codes, ICAO codes and coordinates

Lithuania
 
Airports
Airports
Lithuania